Christine Charlotte of Württemberg (21 October 1645, Stuttgart – 16 May 1699, Bruchhausen) was a princess consort of East Frisia by marriage to George Christian, Prince of East Frisia. She served as the regent of East Frisia during the minority of her son from 1665 until 1690.

Life 
Christine Charlotte was a daughter of  Duke Eberhard III of Württemberg from his first marriage to Anna Dorothea of Salm-Kyrburg.  At the age of 17 she married on 14 May 1662 Count George Christian of East Frisia, who was raised in the same year to the rank of heritable Prince.

Regency
George Christian died on 6 June 1665, leaving his wife pregnant with their third child; four months later (1 October 1665), Christine Charlotte gave birth to a son, Christian Everhard.

As the mother of the new-born prince, she became his guardian and regent of East Frisia.  She tried to rule as an absolutist princess, which led to a series of conflict with the equally self-conscious Estates of East Frisia and brought the country to the brink of civil war several times.  

She was considered extraordinarily beautiful, intelligent and eloquent, but also domineering, unforgiving, unrepentant and wasteful.  Her reign was marked by disputes within East Frisia.  Historians have a negative view of her overall performance, which may be due to her conflicts with the Estates.

Her major foreign policy success was a border treaty with Oldenburg on 22 December 1666.  This treaty created the so-called Golden line, which separates East Frisia from Oldenburg Friesland to this day.

In 1690, the Emperor confirmed the Estates and declared her son of age.

Issue
 Eberhardine Katharina (25 May 1663 – 10 July 1664), died in infancy.
 Juliane Charlotte (3 January 1664 – 3 June 1666), died in infancy.
 Christian Everhard (1 October 1665 – 30 June 1708), successor of his father.

Ancestors

Literature

External links 
 Biographical Dictionary of East Frisia

 

 

1645 births
1699 deaths
17th-century women rulers
Christine Charlotte
Christine Charlotte
Christine Charlotte
17th-century German people
Christine Charlotte
Daughters of monarchs